Trust management may refer to:
Trust management (information system), an abstract system that processes symbolic representations of social trust
Trust management (managerial science)
the management of trusts, whereby property is held by one party for the benefit of another

pl:Zarządzanie zaufaniem